Silas Bent III (October 10, 1820 – August 26, 1887) was a naval officer in the United States Navy prior to the American Civil War. Silas Bent sailed both the Atlantic and Pacific Oceans and was recognized by the Navy for his contributions to oceanography which were published by the Navy. At the outset of the American Civil War, Silas Bent resigned his commission, as his sympathy was for the Southern cause.

Early life and family
Silas Bent III was born on 10 October 1820 in St. Louis, Missouri, a son of a judge of the Missouri Supreme Court, also called Silas, with deep family roots in Massachusetts Bay Colony He married Ann Elizabeth Tyler of Louisville, Kentucky on 5 November 1857 and they had three children Mary Lawrence Bent, Lucy (Bent) McKinley, and  Silas Bent IV, who was a journalist.

U.S. Naval service
Bent was appointed midshipman at age 16 and served in the U.S. Navy for the next 25 years, during which he became well versed in the science of oceanography. He crossed the Atlantic Ocean five times, the Pacific Ocean twice, rounded Cape Horn four times and the Cape of Good Hope once.

Rescuing Americans at Nagasaki
He was serving in Preble in 1849 when that brig sailed into Nagasaki, Japan, to secure the release of 18 shipwrecked American sailors imprisoned by the Japanese. He was flag lieutenant in Mississippi, Commodore Matthew C. Perry's flagship during the expedition to Japan between 1852 and 1854.

Hydrographic surveys
He made hydrographic surveys of Japanese waters. The results of his survey were published by the government in 1857 in Sailing Directions and Nautical Remarks: by Officers of the Late U.S. Naval Expedition to Japan.

Resigned due to Southern sympathies
In 1860, Lt. Bent was detailed to the Hydrographic Division of the United States Coast Survey, but resigned from the Navy on 25 April 1861 at the outbreak of the American Civil War, apparently because of Southern sympathies.

Final years
He returned to St. Louis upon resigning from the Navy and took up the management of his wife's estate. Lt. Bent died on 26 August 1887 at Shelter Island, Long Island, New York, and was buried in Louisville, Kentucky.

Honored in ship naming
The , an oceanographic survey ship, was named in his honor in March 1964.

See also
 Bakumatsu
 United States Coast and Geodetic Survey
 Hydrography

References

External links
 

1820 births
1887 deaths
United States Navy officers
Military personnel from St. Louis
American oceanographers